The 2021 season was Sarawak United's second year in their history and second season in the Malaysia Premier League since last year following rebranding from Selangor United FC. Along with the league, the club will also compete in the Malaysia Cup.

Events
On 17 December 2020, B. Sathianathan signed a two-year contract starting January 2021 as club's technical director.

On 25 December 2020, several players has signed a contract with the club.

Players

First-team squad

Competitions

Malaysia Premier League

League table

Results by round

Matches

Malaysia Cup

Group stage

The draw for the group stage was held on 15 September 2021.

Knockout stage

Quarter-finals

Statistics

Appearances and goals

|-

|-

|-

|-

|-

|-

|-

|-

|-

|-

|-

|-

|-

|-

|-

|-

|-

|-

|-

|-

|-

|-

|-

|-

|}

Clean sheets

References

Sarawak United FC seasons
Sarawak United